Dama is an extinct language of Sierra Leone.  It was replaced by Mende.  Based on a few remembered words and toponyms, Dalby (1963) believed it to be a Northern Mande language, similar to Kono and Vai, but Glottolog leaves it unclassified.

References

Languages of Sierra Leone
Unclassified languages of Africa
Extinct languages of Africa
Mande languages